The Many-Lined Cordgrass Moth (Photedes enervata, until recently Hypocoena enervata) is a species of moth of the family Noctuidae. It is found in marshes along the Atlantic Coast of North America, with scattered inland wetlands records from Nova Scotia and New Brunswick south to Florida.

The larvae feed on Spartina alterniflora.

References

External links
Moths of Maryland

Hadeninae
Moths of North America